Middle Ground Theatre Company began in October 1988 and it is now one of the Midlands’ most prolific and acclaimed production companies, with over thirty productions under its belt.

Past Productions
 Dial M for Murder
 Gaslight
 Spring & Port Wine
 Brief Encounter
 An Inspector Calls
 An Ideal Husband
 The Importance of Being Earnest
 The Railway Children
 Far From The Madding Crowd.

Middle Ground's artistic director and theatrical producer is founder member Michael Lunney.

External links
 Middle Ground Theatre Company

Amateur theatre companies in England